Chandan Sen (Director/Actor)

Birth: 26th February,1963

Father: Lt.Kisholoy Sen

Mother: Lt.Shondya Chakroborty (Shulota Chokroborty)

Graduation: CU (commerce)

● When Communist Party of India (Marxist) was formed,after division from undivided

left,Late Kisholoy Sen joined Indian People's Theatre Association as well as the evening

version of Gonoshokti newspaper as a journalist.In the year 1967,Kisholoy Sen joined

Jyoti Basu as his CA(United front government) and in 1969 he was A.Janab.Rasull's

PA.Shondhya Chakroborty was a regular professional actor in IPTA and also a

practicing singer.

Career

Actor 
From his childhood,Chandan was a regular performer in IPTA.

During his school days,in Ramkrishno Mission Shorisha he took interest in performing arts

especially in theatre.Moreover he grew up in an extensive cultural atmoshphere.

But due to health reasons he had to leave his school at Shorisha and under the guidance of

Mohimda he joined Mitro instituition in the middle of an academic year.

He was a sports enthusiast since childhood.Hence after coming back to Calcutta he started

playing cricket under Komol Basu's coaching in Arians Junior team.

He was a member of under nineteen Bengal team.

For a consistent period of seven years,he was a regular member of first division and second

division cricket.

He was a member of Kalighat Sporting Union,Borisha Sporting,Taltola Sporting ,Greyar,Topon

Memorial etc.

Subsequently,he was taking part in one act competitions throughout Bengal.

● He was a part of 7-8 theatre groups simultaneously.

It was a regular thing for him to be a part of 2-3 theatre groups on the same day.

After IPTA,Chandan first joined Theatre Centre.

Torun Roy was his first director.

Then he joined Nandikar and later on he was suspended.

After that he formed a theatre group with a bunch of friends in Jadavpur University and

continued performing for two years.

In 1983 ,he joined Ramaproshad Bonik's theatre group Chenamukh (Rani Kahini/ Agshuddhi

/Pakhi/ Shoronagoto/Icchegari) He was suspended after six years.

● In 1988, he joined Utpal Dutta's PLT(Kallol/ / Jonotar Aphim/ Laal Durgo/ Ekla Cholo

reCrush Biddho Cuba)

After Utpal Dutt's demise,he joined Romaproshad Bonik's new theatre group Theatre passion

(Kobikotha/ Tempest/ Trata)

Whilst preparing a character overnight,he became a sensation and performed in Chetona's

Kobir for a few days.

Under the direction of Tomal Roychowdhury and Shohag Sen he acted in four plays.

In the year 1996 he joined Ashokenagar Natyaanan and has been a member since then.

In the mean time he had acted in Story Teller's FM Mohanogor and Onyo Theatre's Choitali

Raater Shopno.

Director 
Barring his directorial ventures in colleges and schools he made his directorial debut in 1982 for

Ishita Mukherjee's play Biruddhobadi ,which was adapted from Dirty Hands.

In 1984,he directed Tagore's Bishorjon.

He assisted Utpal Dutto in Chaitali Raater Shopno-The first theatre production for

Poschimbongo Natya Akademy.

From 1983-1992 he was directing street plays and in house plays for Jadavpur University

Drama Club.

He has directed around forty plays till date .

In the year 1998,Dr.Sudipto Chattopadhyay invited him to New York.

Nurldin&#39;s biography was his first international theatrical work.He worked as an assistant director

im this Off Off Broadway play.

It was an Epic Actors Workshop Production.

They went on to stage eleve shows out of which nine shows were housefull.

It was a bilingual play.

The English parts were enacted by eminent American Actors of Equity Actors Union.

They were accompanied by Non residential Indian and Bangladeshi actors.

In Calcutta actors from nandikar and Ashokenagar Natyaanan accompanied the foreign actors.

He staged this play in four theatre festivals.

Later on Chandan directed another play in America.

Spotters ,a Basic Acting school was initiated by Chandan.

● But he failed.

Light and Stage 
Chandan is always interested in Light and Stage design.

He takes interest in modern technology.

He is inspired by Joy Sen and Utpal Dutto.

From 1996 he had designed for each and every production of Ashokenagar Natyaanan.

His first work outside Ashokenagar Natyaanan was for the play Ashlil ,directed by Bratya Basu.

Then he went on to design for Suman Mukhopadhyay's Gontobbo and Choreolenas.

He had designed ligt for Kolkata Opera's Alibaba'rPanchali and Kolkata Choir's dance drama

Chand Shoudagorer Pala and Ekolobbo.

From 2006-2008 ,he has worked as the Chief Technical Director for Epic Actors Workshop's

Jeorge Stuart's Playhouse,in New Jersey for South Asian Theatre Festival .

From 2003-2012 he had designed light in Canada and America for NABC.

Film and Television 
From the end of 1985 he begun his professional acting career in television and commercial

feature films.

He has worked in more than thirty films.

He has done remarkable works in Rituporno Ghosh,Aparna Sen,Anjan Dutto and Probhat Roy's

films.

He had directed ten telefilms and two mega serials Ami Jacchi Thanai and Ek Akasher Niche.

Designer 
Chandan Sen is an eminent theatre hall designer as well.

He is the primary brain behind Krishti,an auditorium in Memary ,GT road.

Nironjon Sadan's new non proscenium theatre hall is his brainchild.

But his most remarkable work remains the Open air theatre in Mohorkunjo.

Television

Films 
 Tirandaj Shabor (2022)
 Syndicate (2021)
 Bumper (short film) (2020)
 Kidnap (2019)
 Maati (2018)
 Byomkesh Bakshi (2015)
 The Royal Bengal Tiger (2014)
 Byomkesh Phire Elo (2014)
 Taan (2014)
 Abar Byomkesh (2012)
 Chora Bali (2011)
 Hatey Roilo Pistol (2011)
 Byomkesh Bakshi (2010)
 Tara (2010)
 Madly Bangali (2009)
 Phera (2008)
 Refugee (2006)
 Abar Asbo Phire (2004)
 Bow Barracks Forever (2004)

Awards and nominations 
He won the Best Actor Award at the Pacific Meridian Film Festival in Russia for his performance in the 2021 film 'The Cloud and the Man' (Manikbabur Megh) directed by Abhinandan Banerjee.

References

External links 
 Chandan Sen's biography in Natya Anan's website

1963 births
Living people
People from Jessore District
Bengali male actors
Bengali male television actors
Bengali theatre personalities
Bengali Hindus
Male actors in Bengali cinema
21st-century Indian male actors